Plasmodium polare is a parasite of the genus Plasmodium subgenus Papernaia.

Like all Plasmodium species P. polare has both vertebrate and insect hosts. The vertebrate hosts for this parasite are birds.

Description 

The parasite was first described by Manwell in 1934.

It is relatively small and produces on the average nine merozoites per infection. It has abundant cytoplasm.

Geographical occurrence 

This parasite occurs in the United States.

Clinical features and host pathology 

Hosts of this species include the bald eagle (Haliaeetus leucocephalus), the barn swallow (Hirundo rustica), yellow wagtails (Motacilla flava) and American cliff swallows (Petrochelidon pyrrhonota).

Related species 

It is related to the following species:

Plasmodium asanum
Plasmodium circumflexum
Plasmodium durae
Plasmodium fallax
Plasmodium formosanum
Plasmodium gabaldoni
Plasmodium hegneri
Plasmodium lophrae
Plasmodium lophrae
Plasmodium pediocetti
Plasmodium pinotti

References

Further reading

polare
Parasites of birds
Parasites of insects